James Holder (born 5 May 1986 in Sydney, New South Wales) is a former motorcycle speedway rider from Australia. He is the older brother of Chris Holder, the 2012 World Champion and Jack Holder, a world team champion.

Career
Holder began his career at the Isle of Wight Islanders in the Premier League. In 2009 he signed for the Newport Wasps after the Islanders quit the Premier League and dropped down a division. His younger brother Chris Holder rides for the Poole Pirates in the British Elite League.

James started the 2010 season with the Stoke Potters, but after they let him go part way through the season he was immediately signed by the Somerset Rebels riding as reserve, initially as a 28-day injury cover. In 2011 he was named captain of the Rebels for up the coming season. In the off season, following the 2011 campaign, Holder signed for the Plymouth Devils for the 2012 Premier League season.

His last season was in 2012 with Plymouth.

References 

1986 births
Living people
Australian speedway riders
Isle of Wight Islanders riders
Newport Wasps riders
Plymouth Devils riders
Somerset Rebels riders